|}

The Bective Stud Champion Novice Hurdle is a Grade 1 National Hunt hurdle race in Ireland which is open to horses aged five years or older. It is run at Punchestown over a distance of about 2 miles ½ furlong (2 miles and 100 yards, or ), and during its running there are nine hurdles to be jumped. The race is for novice hurdlers, and it is scheduled to take place each year during the Punchestown Festival in late April or early May.

The event was formerly open to horses aged four or older, and for a period it was sponsored by BMW. The minimum age was raised to five in 1992, and Country Pride took over the sponsorship in 1993. The race was promoted from Grade 2 to Grade 1 status in 1998.

The Evening Herald became the usual sponsor of the race in 2000. The event was subsequently backed by VC Bet, but the Evening Herald returned as sponsor in 2009. The race was rebranded as the Herald Champion Novice Hurdle in 2013 after the sponsoring newspaper changed its name. Ecomm Merchant Solutions took over sponsorship from the 2021 running and the current sponsors, Bective Stud, took over in 2022.

Records
Leading jockey since 1980 (5 wins):
 Ruby Walsh - Iktitaf (2006), Hurricane Fly (2009), Faugheen (2014), Douvan (2015), Klassical Dream (2019)

Leading trainer since 1980 (8 wins):
 Willie Mullins - Hurricane Fly (2009), Blackstairmountain (2010), Faugheen (2014), Douvan (2015), Cilaos Emery (2017), Draconien (2018), Klassical Dream (2019), Echoes In Rain (2021)

Winners since 1980

See also
 Horse racing in Ireland
 List of Irish National Hunt races

References
 Racing Post:

 pedigreequery.com – VC Bet Champion Novice Hurdle – Punchestown.
 racenewsonline.co.uk – Racenews Archive (April 25, 2003).

National Hunt races in Ireland
National Hunt hurdle races
Punchestown Racecourse